Malé League is the official competition for football clubs in the Malé area. The top four teams qualify for Dhivehi League and bottom two teams play off against relegation with top-2 of 2nd division. Since 2001 top teams qualify for Dhivehi League with some teams from other islands. From 2007 a qualifying stage restricted to Malé does not exist anymore. In the 2017 league, top 4 team will qualify to Dhivehi Premier League and bottom 4 team will play Malé League qualifying round with top 4 team from Second Division.

Previous winners
2001:  Victory Sports Club
2002:  Island FC
2003:  Victory Sports Club
2004:  New Radiant SC
2005:  Club Valencia
2006: Victory Sports Club
2007–2016: not held
2017: Maziya
2018: New Radiant SC

References

Malé League champions at RSSSF

Football leagues in the Maldives
National association football cups